Malfouf salad or cabbage salad, is a Lebanese salad, typically consisting of shredded cabbage, lemon juice, olive oil, garlic, salt and dried mint.

See also
 List of Arabic salads

References

Arab cuisine
Cabbage dishes
Salads